Club Deportivo Municipal Limeño is a professional Salvadoran football club based in Santa Rosa de Lima, La Unión, El Salvador. Their home stadium is Estadio Jose Ramon Flores, with a capacity of 5,000.

Limeño have won five Segunda División titles. Municipal Limeño have lost two Primera División finals in 1999 and 2001.

History
The club was founded on 11 September 1949 and started and continues to be based in the town of Santa Rosa de Lima in the department of La Union.
The club began playing in the second division and spent almost twenty years there until in 1971 Municipal Limeño got promoted to the top flight at the expense of UCA.

First tenure in the first division (1972–1975)
Municipal Limeño campaign of the 1972 season was exceptional one for a newly promoted team with them coming in sixth place with sixteen points their team was led strongly by the Guatemalan Tomas Gambo, who scored five goals (the team leading goalscorer) and enabled the club to qualify to the semi-final group. However their experience was an unhappy one with the team losing all their games and bowing out of championship contention.
Limeño 1973 and 1974 season were unhappy campaign with the team struggling and finishing in the relegation group, however both time the team managed to survive relegation at the expense of Excelsior and Sonsonate.
But after several near relegation, Municipal Limeño finally were relegated in the 1975 season after only earning 16 points from 33 games. The club were forced to play a promotion-relegation battle against Once Municipal in which the team lost and were relegated to the second division along with Juventud Olímpico.

Second Tenure in the first division (1993–2005)
It would not be until 1993, 18 years after getting relegated, that they would make a return to the first division.
during their second tenure (1993–05) in the first division they reached the semi-finals six times, including reaching the grand final in the Apertura 1999 and Apertura 2000 under the coaching off Óscar Emigdio Benítez however both time the club lost in the grand final against Águila.
They were once again relegated in 2005, after they lost a promotion-relegation match against Coca-Cola of Soyapango.

Third Tenure in the first division (2009–2010)
On 26 June 2009, Chalatenango going through financial troubles, sold their spot in the top flight Primera División to side Limeño. This resulted Municipal Limeño's return to the First Division after a four-year hiatus. However their campaign was an unhappy one with them finishing second last and forcing them to play a promotion/relegation match against Once Municipal which they lost and were relegated to the Second Division and that's where the club has remained ever since.

Recent Events
The club spent the next few seasons trying to regain promotion to the First Division, they made several second division semi-finals and grand finals but always falling short, however the club finally succeeded when they won the Apertura 2015 title defeating Fuerte San Francisco, then winning the Clausura 2016 title defeating Atlético Comalapa of Chalatenango 5–4 in penalties, after tying on aggregate 3–3, the club were promoted back to the Primera Division.

Municipal Limeno confirmed a fourth relegation from the Primera division on 2 May 2022 despite a 1–0 victory over Isidro Metapan at Jose Romero Berios. Limeno's run in the Primera División from 2016 to 2022 was a mix of little to moderate success, with the biggest success of the club was reaching CONCACAF League the first international tournament for the club and Being the club Nicolas Munoz scored his 303-goal making him the highest scorer in Central American league history.

Stadium
Municipal Limeño plays their home matches on the Estadio Jose Ramon Flores in the suburb of Santa Rosa de Lima in La Union. The Estadio Jose Ramon Flores has been Municipal Limeño's home stadium since its creation 1963.

Home stadiums
 Estadio Jose Ramon Flores; Santa Rosa de Lima (1963–present)
 Estadio Cuscatlán; San Salvador (2018, 2020)

Rivalries
Municipal Limeño have rivalries with several clubs, including local rivalries with Atlético Balboa. A rivalry with Águila was created when Águila and Limeño, faced each other twice in grand finals (Both falling in the way of Águila). When former Limeño player Rudis Corrales moved to Águila, it caused uproar with Águila supporters.

Limeno has supported a long rivalry with Pasaquina for geographical reasons, since both are from the province of La Union; this clash is called the "Derby Unionense."

Honours
Municipal Limeño have won Domestic league honours predominately in the lower leagues. The club's last El Salvador honour was in 2016 when they won the Segunda División in 2016.

Domestic honours
First Division of El Salvador
 Runners-up (2) – Apertura 1999, Apertura 2000
 Segunda División Salvadorean and predecessors 
 Champions: (5)::1971, 1992, 1993, Apertura 2015, Clausura 2016
 Tercera División Salvadorean and predecessors 
 Champions: N/A

Current squad
Updated 19 September 2022.

Current technical staff of Municipal Limeño 2020/2023

Coaching staff
As of December 2022

Reserve Municipal Limeño 2020/2021

Reserve squad

Management Municipal Limeño 2020/2023

Board of Directors

Managers

League history

Overall seasons table in Primera División de Fútbol Profesional
{|class="wikitable"
|-bgcolor="#efefef"
! Pos.
! Club
! Season In D1
! Pl.
! W
! D
! L
! GS
! GA
! Dif.
|-
|align=center bgcolor=|TBA
|Municipal Limeno
|align=center |23
|align=center|880
|align=center|263
|align=center|293
|align=center|324
|align=center|1068
|align=center|1172
|align=center|-104
|}

Last updated: 11 May 2022

Players

Internationals who have played at Limeño
Players marked in bold gained their caps while playing at Limeno.

 Tomás Gamboa
 Rudis Corrales
 Deris Umanzor
 Santos Rivera
 Elmer Martínez
 Josue Galdamez
 Francisco Osorto
 Julio César de León
 Carlos Guity
 Marvin Sanchez
 Kevin Carabantes
 Rudy Valencia
 Diego Coca
 Julio Palacios
 Magdonio Corrales
 Franklin Delgado
 Erick Martinez
 Nicolás Muñoz
 Edwin Gonzalez
 Edwin Martinez
 Rene Galan
 Marvin Benitez
 Cesar Charun
 Oris Velasquez
 Francisco Alvarez
 Francisco Fuentes
 Selvin Zelaya
 Yuvini Salamanca
 Jorge Martinez
 Daniel Sagistizado
 Francis Reyes
 Elias Montes
 Martin Paredes
 Isidro Gutierrez
 Salvador Coreas
 Carlos Menjivar
 Walter Soto
 Victor Velasquez
 Henry Romero
 Rolando Torres
 Manfredi Portillo
 Fabricio Alfaro
 Rommel Mejia
 Irvin Valdez
 Jairo Henriquez
 Jose Angel Pena
 Harold Alas
 Isaac Zelaya
 Edwin Sanchez
 Marlon Cornejo
 Carlos Rivera
 Victor Coreas
 Gilberto Ramirez
 Francisco Osorto
 Rómulo Villalobos

Captains
Only captains in competitive matches are included.
Players marked in bold are still playing in the professional team.

Personnel honours

 (Apertura 1999)  Magdonio Corrales Goals Scored (9)
 (Clausura 2001)  Rudis Corrales Goals Scored (13)
 (Apertura 2016)  Jefferson Viveros Goals Scored (13)

Records
Debut in the Primera División: 2–3 FAS, Estadio Santaneco, 7 May 1972
Highest league position: 1st in the Primera División (Apertura 1999, Apertura 2000)
Best post season finish: Runners up (Apertura 1999, Apertura 2000)
Record League victory: 8–3 vs. Dragón (Primera División, May 2003)
Largest Home victory, Primera División: 4–1 v TBD, 2 February 2020
Largest Away victory, Primera División: 3–0 v TBD, 29 October 2018
Largest Home loss, Primera División: 1–3 v TBD, 4 November 2018
Largest Away loss, Primera División: 1–4 v TBD, 7 April 2019
Record attendance at Estadio Jose Ramon Flores : 25,133 v TBD, Primera División (TBD)
Most League appearances: 317, TBD (TBD)
Most League goals scored: total, TBD, TBD (1998–2003)
Most League goals scored, season: 13 (TBD)
Worst season: TBD 2002–2003: 0 win, 0 draws and 0 losses (0 points)
Debut in CONCACAF Competition: Municipal Limeño 1–2 Forge FC; Estadio Cuscatlán; 23 October 2020
First CONCACAF League match: Municipal Limeño 1–2 Forge FC; Estadio Cuscatlán; 23 October 2020

Individual records
 Record appearances (all competitions): TBD, 822 from 1957 to 1975
 Record appearances (Primera Division): Paraguayan TBD, 64 from 2018 to 2019
 Most capped player for El Salvador: 76 (17 whilst at Limeno), Rudis Corrales
 Most international caps for El Salvador while a Limeno player: 17, Rudis Corrales
 Most caps won whilst at Limeno: 17, Rudis Corrales.
 Record scorer in league: Rudis Corrales, 77
 First goal scorer in International competition: Kevin Oviedo (v. Forge FC; Estadio Cuscatlan; 23 October 2020)
 Most goals in a season (all competitions): TBD, 62 (1927/28) (47 in League, 15 in Cup competitions)
 Most goals in a season (Primera Division): Rudis Corrales (Clausura 2001) and Jefferson Viveros (Apertura 2016), 13
 Longest streak without conceding a goal: Abiel Aguilera 495 minutes (Apertura 2017)
 First international to play for Limeno – Jorge Vásquez, 1973 (El Salvador 1967–1972)
 First Limeno international – Magdonio Corrales (for El Salvador v Guatemala, 19 March 1999)

Most Appearance (Apertura/Clausura season games only)

Most Appearances 

Note: Players in bold text are still active with Limeno

Top goalscorers (Apertura/Clausura season games only) 

Note: ''Players in bold text are still active with Municipal Limeno

Other departments

Football

Reserve team
The reserve team serves mainly as the final stepping stone for promising young players under the age of 21 before being promoted to the main team. The second team is coached by Eduardo Castillo. the team played in the Primera División Reserves, their greatest successes were winning the Reserve championships in Clausura 2001, Apertura 2008. 
It plays its home matches at TBD, adjacent to the first team's ground, and it is coached by José Romero.

Junior teams
The youth team (under 17 and under 15) has produced some of El Salvador's top football players, including TBD and TBD. It plays its home matches at TBD, adjacent to the first team's ground, and it is coached by José Dagoberto Sosa.

Women's team
The women's first team, which is led by head coach TBD, features several members of the El Salvador national ladies team. Their greatest successes were reaching the Clausura 2019 final which they ended up losing 7–1 to FAS Ladies team.
The women's team was created in 2018 and will first participate in 2019

References

External links
 Profile at El Grafico 

Football clubs in El Salvador
Association football clubs established in 1949
1949 establishments in El Salvador